Klaffer am Hochficht is a municipality in the district of Rohrbach in the Austrian state of Upper Austria.

Geography
Klaffer lies in the Mühlviertel. About 60 percent of the municipality is forest, and 38 percent is farmland.

References

Cities and towns in Rohrbach District
Bohemian Forest